Gary Barlow in Concert (also known as The Theatre Tour) was a concert tour by British singer-songwriter Gary Barlow. The 49-date tour around the United Kingdom and Ireland began on 16 April 2018 in Edinburgh, Scotland and concluded on 23 June 2018 in Nottinghamshire, England. Tickets on sale were sold out in less than a day due to high demand.

Opening act
 KT Tunstall (16 April to 26 May)
 Jason Brock (28 May to 23 June)

Set list
 "Introduction" by Mike Stevens
 "Since I Saw You Last"
 "Greatest Day"
 "These Days"
 "Live Those Years Again"
 "Open Road"
 "Pray"
 "A Million Love Songs"
 Musical Medley ("Something About This Night"/"Dare")
 "Another Crack In My Heart"
 "Love Ain't Here Anymore"
 Swing Medley ("Sure"/"Everything Changes"/"Could It Be Magic")
 Piano Medley ("Shine"/"Said It All") 
 "Forever Love" 
 "Love Won't Wait"
 "Patience"
 "Back For Good"
 "Let Me Go"
 "Relight My Fire"
 "Cry"
 "Rule The World"
 "Never Forget"

Tour dates

References

 2018 concert tours
Gary Barlow concert tours